The Pharaoh Lake Wilderness Area, an Adirondack Park unit of New York's Forest Preserve, straddles the Essex County-Warren County line in the towns of Ticonderoga, Hague, Horicon and Schroon. The county road along the east shore of Schroon Lake forms the western boundary; to the north, private land and NY 74 form the boundary. The state land boundary forms most of the remaining perimeter except for a stretch of NY 8 on the south.

The area contains 39 bodies of water covering 1,100 acres (4.4 km2), 62.8 miles (101 km) of foot trails, and 14 lean-tos.

Geography

Pharaoh Mountain is the only mountain of much size, although the smaller hills have very steep sides and cliffs, presenting more of an impression of relief than actually exists.

Forest

Fires have burned over most of the region in the past. As a result of this and the dry sites, much of the tree growth is coniferous with some white birch mixed in. The white pine-white birch type along the shores of several of the lakes and ponds adds immeasurably to their attractiveness. Stands of some of the best quality Adirondack hardwoods exist in the covelike pockets of the unburned area in the northeast.

Water

Pharaoh Lake, which gives the unit its name, is one of the largest lakes in the Adirondack Park that lies totally within the Forest Preserve.

Recreation

The area is a popular destination for hiking and backpacking because of its proximity to the Adirondack Northway. Its lean-tos and camp sites provide ample space to camp along its 70 miles of foot trails.

See also
 List of Wilderness Areas in the Adirondack Park
 Pharaoh Mountain
 Spectacle Pond (Schroon, New York)

References

 Adirondack Park Agency. "Adirondack State Land Master Plan", Updated 2001. 
 Department of Environmental Conservation. "Pharaoh Lake Wilderness Area." 

Wilderness areas in Adirondack Park
Protected areas of Essex County, New York
Protected areas of Warren County, New York